Mohammadali Carim Chagla (30 September 1900 – 9 February 1981) was an Indian jurist, diplomat, and Cabinet Minister who served as Chief Justice of the Bombay High Court from 1947 to 1958.

Early life and education 

Born on 30 September 1900 in Bombay to a well-off Gujarati Ismaili Khoja family, Chagla suffered a lonely childhood owing to his mother's death in 1905. His childhood was spent in their family mansion in near Nagdevi Street and Janjiker Lane, Khokha Bazar in Pydhonie. He later bought a mansion in Malabar Hill in 1934. He was educated at St. Xavier's High School and College in Bombay, after which he went on to study Modern History at Lincoln College, Oxford, from 1918–21, taking a BA in 1921 and MA in 1925. In 1922, he was admitted to the Bar of the Bombay High Court, where he worked with such illuminaries as Sir Jamshedji Kanga and Mohammed Ali Jinnah, who would one day become the founder of Pakistan.

Career 

Chagla was appointed Professor of law at the Government Law College, Bombay in 1927, where he worked with Dr. B.R. Ambedkar. He was appointed a judge to Bombay High Court in 1941, becoming Chief Justice in 1948 and serving in that capacity to 1958. All through, he continued to write and speak strongly for the Indian freedom cause and against the communal two nation ideology.

In 1946, Chagla was part of the first Indian delegation to the UN. From 4 October to 10 December 1956, Chagla served as Acting Governor of the then state of Bombay, later broken up into the states of Gujarat and Maharashtra. Following his tenure as Chief Justice, he served as the one-man commission that examined the Finance Minister of India, T. T. Krishnamachari, over the controversial Haridas Mundhra LIC insurance scandal, which forced Krishnamachari's resignation as Finance Minister. Krishnamachari was quite close to Nehru, who became intensely angry at Chagla for his revelations of TTK's part in the affair, though he later forgave Chagla. From September 1957 to 1959, Chagla served as ad hoc judge to the International Court of Justice at The Hague.

After retirement he served as Indian ambassador to the US from 1958 to 1961. Chagla then served as Indian High Commissioner in the UK from April 1962 to September 1963. Immediately on his return, he was asked to be a Cabinet Minister, which he accepted, and he served as Education Minister from 1963 to 1966, then served as the Minister for External Affairs of India from November 1966 to September 1967, after which he left government service. He then spent the remaining years of his life actively, continuing to practice law into his seventies.

As Minister of Education under Jawaharlal Nehru, Chagla was distraught by the quality of education in government schools:
Our Constitution fathers did not intend that we just set up hovels, put students there, give untrained teachers, give them bad textbooks, no playgrounds, and say, we have complied with Article 45 and primary education is expanding... They meant that real education should be given to our children between the ages of 6 and 14

Personal life and family 

In 1930, Chagla married Mehrunissa Dharsi Jivraj, a lady of his own community and similar family background. Their marriage was harmonious and conventional. The couple had four children, two sons, Jehangir (b. 1934) and Iqbal (b. 1939) and two daughters, Husnara (b. 1932) and Nuru (b. 193x). Their son Iqbal Chagla became a lawyer; with his wife Roshan, he has a daughter (M.C. Chagla's granddaughter) Rohiqa, who is the widow of Cyrus Mistry, the former chairman of Tata Sons in the period 2014–2016. Iqbal's son Riaz (b. c. 1970) was himself appointed a judge of the Bombay High Court in July 2017.

Chagla's younger daughter, Nuru, married Subbaram Swaminathan, a south Indian Hindu gentleman, son of politician Ammu Swaminathan and brother of captain Lakshmi Swaminathan and Mrinalini Sarabhai.

Mehrunissa Dharsi Jivraj died in November 1961. Chagla survived her by nineteen years, dying in February 1981.

Last years and death 

In 1973, Chagla published his autobiography, Roses in December, with the help of his son Iqbal. He vehemently protested against the Indian Emergency. He died on 9 February 1981, at the age of 80 of heart failure. He had been unwell for several years, and had suffered four heart attacks. True to his active and energetic nature, he had not let his health slow him down. On the day of his death, he went as usual to his club in Bombay and had a good time with his friends. He then slipped away to the dressing room and there, peacefully died. According to his wish, he was cremated instead of having a traditional Muslim burial. The Bombay High Court was closed to show respect for him, and several speeches were made in his memory, including one by former Prime Minister, Atal Bihari Vajpayee.

In 1985, a statue of Chagla was unveiled and placed within the High Court  outside the Chief Justice's Court where he once served. The inscription on the statue plinth reads:

"A great judge, a great citizen, and, above all, a great human being."

Further facts 

Though born a Muslim, Chagla was more of an agnostic.

The surname "Chagla" was not his original surname. In Chagla's autobiography, he recounted that in his youth, he was known as "Merchant" as both his father and grandfather were merchants. Hating the name due to its associations with money, he went to his grandfather one day and asked him as to what he should call himself. His grandfather promptly replied "Chagla" as his father, Chagla's great-grandfather, had had Chagla as his pet name, which in the Kutchi language means "favourite". Chagla promptly adopted the new surname.

References

Further reading 

Roses In December, an autobiography, M.C. Chagla, Tenth Edition, Bharatiya Vidya Bhavan, 2000,

External links 

M C Chagla

1900 births
1981 deaths
Politicians from Mumbai
20th-century Indian judges
High Commissioners of India to the United Kingdom
Indian barristers
Indian Ismailis
Indian agnostics
Judges of the Bombay High Court
Ambassadors of India to the United States
Alumni of Lincoln College, Oxford
Founders of Indian schools and colleges
Rajya Sabha members from Maharashtra
Ministers for External Affairs of India
Education Ministers of India
Members of the Cabinet of India
Leaders of the Rajya Sabha
Chief Justices of the Bombay High Court
All India Muslim League members
Indian Shia Muslims
Gujarati people
20th-century Indian lawyers
20th-century Indian politicians